Proceedings of the National Academy of Sciences, India Section B: Biological Sciences is a peer-reviewed scientific journal of biological science. It is published by Springer on behalf of National Academy of Sciences, India four times a year, and is edited by Amit Ghosh.

Abstracting and indexing
The journal is abstracted and indexed in the following bibliographic databases:

According to the Journal Citation Reports, the journal has a 2020 impact factor of 0.96.

References

External links

Springer Science+Business Media academic journals
Biology journals
English-language journals
Publications established in 1930
Quarterly journals